Spiš Arena is a sports arena in Spišská Nová Ves, Slovakia.  It is primarily used for ice hockey, and is the home arena of HK Spišská Nová Ves. Spiš Arena was opened in 1982 as Zimný Štadión SNV and has a seating capacity for 5,503 people for Ice hockey games. The arena has one of only two real-time biometry and facial recognition systems in the world. It was implemented by Colosseo EAS, a Slovak company that also built the arena's game presentation system.

Notable events
An overview of some sport events:

1987
1987 Winter Universiade

1994
IIHF World Championship Group C1

1999
1999 Winter Universiade

2017
2017 IIHF World Under-18 Championship

References

Indoor ice hockey venues in Slovakia
Buildings and structures in Košice Region
Sport in Košice Region
Spišská Nová Ves
1982 establishments in Czechoslovakia
Sports venues completed in 1982